SVRG can refer to:

 Silicon Valley Roller Girls, a roller derby league from San Jose, California
 Stuttgart Valley Rollergirlz, a roller derby league from Stuttgart in Germany
 Stochastic Variance Reduced Gradient, an optimization method